Sea spleenwort may refer to:

 a species of fern, Asplenium marinum
 a species of hydroid, Thuiaria articulata